The stern ctenotus (Ctenotus severus)  is a species of skink found in Western Australia.

References

severus
Reptiles described in 1969
Taxa named by Glen Milton Storr